David Baldwin (11 December 1921 – 7 July 2012) was a lawn bowls international competitor for New Zealand.

Personal life
Born in Auckland, Baldwin was educated at New Plymouth Boys' High School and worked for 43 years at the New Plymouth City Council as a civil engineer. In early days he excelled in numerous sports including cricket, tennis, table tennis and soccer.

Bowls career
At the 1974 British Commonwealth Games he won the men's fours gold medal partnering Kerry Clark, Gordon Jolly and John Somerville. At the following 1978 Commonwealth Games he won the silver medal again in the men's fours.

He won three New Zealand National Bowls Championships titles when bowling for the Paritutu Bowling Club: the pairs in 1971 with John Murtagh, the fours in 1972 with Murtagh, Bruce John and Ken Tompkins, and the fours again in 1974 with Murtagh, Bruce Ballinger and Ken Murtagh. Baldwin holds 16 Taranaki titles in bowls.

Baldwin remained a casual participant until just a few months before he died on 7 July 2012 in New Plymouth.

Awards
In 2013, Baldwin was an inaugural inductee into the Bowls New Zealand Hall of Fame.

References

New Zealand male bowls players
Commonwealth Games gold medallists for New Zealand
Commonwealth Games silver medallists for New Zealand
Bowls players at the 1974 British Commonwealth Games
Bowls players at the 1978 Commonwealth Games
2012 deaths
1921 births
Commonwealth Games medallists in lawn bowls
20th-century New Zealand people
21st-century New Zealand people
Medallists at the 1974 British Commonwealth Games
Medallists at the 1978 Commonwealth Games